HMS Seahorse was a member of the Gibraltar Group of 24-gun sixth rates. After commissioning she spent her career in Home waters and North America on trade protection duties. She was rebuilt at Deptford between 1725 and 1727. After her rebuild she served in Home Waters, North America, West Indies and the Mediterranean on trade protection. She was sold in 1749.

Seahorse was the sixth vessel so named, the first being a ship captured 1625 and last mentioned in 1635.

Construction
She was ordered on 21 August 1711 from Portsmouth Dockyard to be built under the guidance of Richard Stacey, Master Shipwright of Portsmouth. She was launched on 13 February 1712. She was completed on 4 May 1712 at an initial cost of £1,869.17.53/4

Commissioned Service
She was commissioned in 1712 under the command of Captain James Dalzell, RN. Captain Dalzell was killed in action with a privateer on 14 September 1712 and Captain William Basille, RN took command. In January 1713 Captain Hercules Baker, RN took command. Later in 1713 Captain Charles Arundel, RN the  took command followed by Captain Joseph Soanes, RN in 1715 for service in the Leeward Islands. She returned to Home Waters in 1716 for a small repair at Deptford from September to December 1716 at a cost of £1,302.12.9d. She was under the command of Captain Thomas Willyams, RN in 1717 for service in the North Sea and Baltic. Captain William Martin, RN. Sailed to Newfoundland in 1719. Captain Thomas Durell, RN took command in 1720 for service in New England. She returned to Home Waters and underwent a survey on 20 March 1727 and was ordered to be rebuilt as a 375-ton sixth rate.

Rebuild at Deptford 1725 - 1727
She was dismantled at Deptford in preparation for rebuilding as a 374 tom 20-gun sixth rate under the guidance of Richard Stacey, Master Shipwright of Deptford. She was launched on 7 October 1727. The tonnage calculation would be 37445/94 tons. The gun armament as established in 1713 would be twenty 6-pounder 19 hundredweight (cwt) guns mounted on wooden trucks. She was completed for sea on 30 November 1727 at a cost of £3,953.14.0d including fitting.

Commissioned Service after Rebuild
She was commissioned in 1728 under the command of Captain Ambrose Saunders, RN for service in Ireland. Captain Saunders died on 6 March 1731. She was fitted at Sheerness for service in the West Indies in June 1731. After her fitting was complete she was commissioned under Captain Edward Baker for service in the Leeward Islands. She returned home and paid off in January 1734. She underwent a middling repair and refitted at Sheerness for £1,928.1.1d from March 1734 to February 1735. After completion, she was commissioned under Captain James Compton, RN for service at Georgia. She returned home and paid off on 9 December 1738. Upon her return she underwent a great repair at Deptford for £5,033.18.3d from March thru November 1739. She recommissioned in October 1739 under Captain William Cleland, RN. Captain Thomas Limeburner, RN took command in July 1740 and sailed with Ogle's Squadron to the West Indies arriving in November 1740. In May 1741 she was under Captain Edward Allen, RN, in May 1742 Captain Thorpe Fowke, RN then in 1745 under Captain John Simcoe, RN all for service at Jamaica. She participated in Mitchell's encounter with Conflans between 4 and 13 August 1746. She returned home in 1747.

Disposition
HMS Seahorse was sold by Admiralty Order (AO) 1 December 1747 to Mr Milward for £5,033.18.3d on 28 July 1748.

Notes

Citations

References
 Winfield 2009, British Warships in the Age of Sail (1603 – 1714), by Rif Winfield, published by Seaforth Publishing, England © 2009, EPUB , Chapter 6, The Sixth Rates, Vessels acquired from 2 May 1660, Gibraltar Group, Seahorse
 Winfield 2007, British Warships in the Age of Sail (1714 – 1792), by Rif Winfield, published by Seaforth Publishing, England © 2007, EPUB , Chapter 6, Sixth Rates, Sixth Rates of 20 or 24 guns, Vessels in Service at 1 August 1714, Gibraltar Group, Seahorse
 Colledge, Ships of the Royal Navy, by J.J. Colledge, revised and updated by Lt Cdr Ben Warlow and Steve Bush, published by Seaforth Publishing, Barnsley, Great Britain, © 2020, EPUB , (EPUB), Section S (Seahorse)

 

1710s ships
Corvettes of the Royal Navy
Ships built in Portsmouth
Naval ships of the United Kingdom